Professor Jane Norman MD, MB ChB, CCT, MRCOG, FRCOG, FRCP Edin, F Med Sci, FRSE is an academic and physician. She was appointed Dean of the Faculty of Health Sciences at the University of Bristol in 2019.

Education 
She graduated in medicine from the University of Edinburgh in 1986. After early clinical and academic training in obstetrics and gynaecology in Edinburgh, she was awarded the degree of MD by the University of Edinburgh in 1992.

Research and career 
She was Regius Chair of obstetrics and gynaecology at the University of Glasgow and Head of the Section of Reproductive and Maternal Medicine from 2006. In 2008, she became Professor of Maternal and Fetal Health at the University of Edinburgh and Director of the Edinburgh Tommy's Centre for maternal and fetal health research. In 2014, she also became Vice-principal of Equality and Diversity (now Vice-principal, People and Culture) at the University of Edinburgh.

Her research focusses on the pregnancy “stressors” of obesity, maternal depression/stress, inflammation and hypoxia.

She previously maintained a clinical practice as a Consultant Obstetrician at the Royal Infirmary of Edinburgh.

Professional qualifications 

 Fellowship of the Academy of Medical Sciences, F Med Sci
 Fellowship of the Royal College of Physicians of Edinburgh, FRCP (Edin)
 Fellowship of the Society of Biology, FSB
 Faculty of Pharmaceutical Medicine, RCP, Certificate in GCP
 Royal College of Obstetricians and Gynaecologists, FCRO
 STA Royal College of Medical Colleges, CCT
 Royal College of Obstetricians and Gynaecologists, MRCOG
 Fellowship of the Royal Society of Edinburgh, FRSE

References 

Living people
Alumni of the University of Edinburgh Medical School
Academics of the University of Bristol
Fellows of the Academy of Medical Sciences (United Kingdom)
Fellows of the Royal Society of Biology
Fellows of the Royal Society of Edinburgh
Year of birth missing (living people)